Michael A. Dwyer (born June 13, 1952) is an American attorney, farmer, and politician serving as a member of the North Dakota Senate from the 47th district. Elected in November 2018, he assumed office on December 1, 2018.

Early life and education 
Dwyer was born in Williston, North Dakota in 1952. He earned a Bachelor of Arts degree from St. Olaf College and a Juris Doctor from the University of North Dakota School of Law.

Career 
Dwyer was admitted to the State Bar Association of North Dakota in 1977. In addition to his work as a lawyer, Dwyer owned Dwyer Farms and was the executive director of the North Dakota Water Education Foundation. He was elected to the North Dakota Senate in November 2018 and assumed office on December 1, 2018. Since 2019, he has also served as vice chair of the Senate Judiciary Committee.

References 

1952 births
People from Williston, North Dakota
People from Williams County, North Dakota
North Dakota lawyers
St. Olaf College alumni
University of North Dakota alumni
Republican Party North Dakota state senators
Living people